The Harvard Crimson men's soccer team is an intercollegiate varsity sports team of Harvard University. The team is a member of the Ivy League of the National Collegiate Athletic Association.

The Crimson fielded their first varsity team in 1905, making the team one of the oldest college soccer programs in the United States, and one of the oldest continuously operating soccer programs in the United States. Most of the Crimson's success came in the mid-1910s, where they won two ISFL championships (the college soccer predecessor to the NCAA), and again in the late 1920s to the early 1930s. Several professional soccer players, including Shep Messing, Ross Friedman, Andre Akpan, Michael Fucito and John Catliff played for the Crimson, as well as several notable professionals outside of the soccer world. This includes Theodore Roosevelt III, Daniel Needham and John Johansen.

Since their 1930 ISFL title, the Crimson have failed to win a national title, although in the late 1960s and early 1970s the Crimson reached the College Cup twice. Also, in both 1986 and 1987 the Crimson reached the NCAA Division I Final Four. Their most recent appearance in the NCAA Division I Men's Soccer Championship came in 2009, when the Crimson reached the round of 16.

From 2013 through 2019, the Crimson were coached by Pieter Lehrer, a former assistant coach for the California Golden Bears men's soccer program. In 2014, Ross Friedman attained two all-time Harvard records with 12 season assists and 17 career assists, also ranking 6th in the NCAA in assists and 5th in assists per game.

In November 2016, the team were suspended by the university after the student newspaper The Harvard Crimson published an article which indicated that team members had shared a yearly document in which they ranked new members of Harvard Crimson women's soccer team by their sex appeal and described them using sexually explicit terms. The suspension meant that they could no longer participate in any further games in the 2016 Ivy League men's soccer season (which they had been leading at the time of the suspension) or the National Collegiate Athletic Association.

Roster

Rivalries 
Yale – Harvard athletics have a longstanding rivalry with Yale across all sports, and it also translates to the men's soccer programs. Both programs have faced each other on an annual basis since 1907. The Crimson lead the series against the Bulldogs 53-38-12.

Team honors

National championships

Conference championships 
Harvard has won 13 Ivy League championships. The Ivy League began sponsoring men's varsity soccer in 1955. Prior to 1955, Harvard competed as an Independent.

Individual honors

First Team All-Americans 
Harvard has fielded 38 first-team All-Americans. Several players including Andre Akpan, John Catliff and Will Kohler had professional careers following college. Other notable All-Americans include John Johansen, who was part of the Harvard Five and Daniel Needham, who was a future politician and commanding general for the 26th Infantry Division.

Second Team All-Americans 
Harvard has fielded 16-second-team All-Americans.

Third Team All-Americans 
Harvard has fielded three third-team All-Americans.

Kit history
First kits

Second kits

Notable alumni

 John Catliff
 Shep Messing
 Ross Friedman

See also 
Harvard Crimson

References

External links

 

 
1905 establishments in Massachusetts
Association football clubs established in 1905